John H. Kamper (December 17, 1857 – October 3, 1933) was a member of the Wisconsin State Assembly.

Biography
Kamper was born on December 17, 1857 in Denmark. He moved with his parents to Wisconsin in 1866, settling in Racine County.

He died at his home in Raymond on October 3, 1933.

Career
Kamper was elected to the Assembly in 1908. In 1902, Kamper had been an unsuccessful candidate for the Assembly, losing to Edward F. Rakow after a tie vote. Additionally, he served as a Justice of the Peace, a town chairman (similar to Mayor) and Chairman of the Racine County Board of Supervisors. He was a Republican.

References

External links
 
 The Political Graveyard

Danish emigrants to the United States
People from Racine County, Wisconsin
Republican Party members of the Wisconsin State Assembly
County supervisors in Wisconsin
1857 births
1933 deaths
Burials in Wisconsin